Being No One, Going Nowhere is the fifth studio album by the Portland-based indie rock band Strfkr, released on November 4, 2016 on Polyvinyl Records.

Track listing

Charts

References

2016 albums
STRFKR albums
Polyvinyl Record Co. albums